William C. Finnie is an adjunct business professor at Washington University in St. Louis, Missouri. Finnie is a contributing editor at Strategy and Leadership and has written Hands-On Strategy: the Guide to Crafting Your Company's Future.

References

Washington University in St. Louis faculty
Living people
Year of birth missing (living people)
Place of birth missing (living people)